Katabuchi or Katafuchi (written: 片渕) is a Japanese surname. Notable people with the surname include:

, Japanese footballer and manager
, Japanese judoka
, Japanese anime director

Japanese-language surnames